The 1952 Wichita Shockers football team, sometimes known as the Wheatshockers, was an American football team that represented Wichita  University (now known as Wichita State University) as a member of the Missouri Valley Conference during the 1952 college football season. In its third and final season under head coach Robert S. Carlson, the team compiled a 3–6–1 record (0–3 against conference opponents), finished last out of five teams in the MVC, and was outscored by a total of 235 to 159. The team played its home games at Veterans Field, now known as Cessna Stadium.

Schedule

References

Wichita
Wichita State Shockers football seasons
Wichita Shockers football